= Dogwood Trace, Lexington =

Neighborhood in Lexington, Kentucky

Coordinates: 37.988°N 84.586°W

Dogwood Trace is a neighborhood in southwestern Lexington, Kentucky, United States. Its boundaries are South Elkhorn Creek to the north and east, Harrodsburg Road to the west, and the Jessamine County line to the south.

Neighborhood statistics

- Area: 0.221 square miles (0.57 km^{2})
- Population: 744
- Population density: 3,364 people per square mile
- Median household income: $99,858
